English rock guitarist Jeff Beck played with multiple groups, including the Yardbirds, the Jeff Beck Group and Beck, Bogert & Appice. He released numerous studio, live, compilation, video and soundtrack albums during his career, as well as over twenty singles.

Albums

Studio albums

Live albums

Compilation albums

Soundtrack albums

Video albums

Singles

Guest appearances

Beck has appeared as a guest artist on many recordings, including the following:

Donovan's 1968 album Barabajagal on the title track and "Trudi"
The GTOs' 1969 album Permanent Damage on the tracks "Eureka Springs Garbage Lady",  "Shock Treatment" and "Captain Fat's Theresa Shoes"
Stevie Wonder's 1972 album Talking Book on the track "Lookin' for Another Pure Love"
Badger's song "White Lady" from the 1974 album White Lady
Stanley Clarke's 1975 album Journey to Love on the title track and "Hello Jeff"
Narada Michael Walden's 1976 album Garden of Love Light on the track "Saint and the Rascal"
Stanley Clarke's 1978 album Modern Man on the song "Rock 'n Roll Jelly"
Stanley Clarke's 1979 album I Wanna Play For You on the song "Jamaican Boy"
Folkways Records' 1980 album Candy Band Sings Going Home (New Songs For Children & Parents)
Rod Stewart's album Camouflage (on three tracks)
Tina Turner's album Private Dancer
Diana Ross's album Swept Away
Mick Jagger's 1985 album She's the Boss and 1987 album Primitive Cool
 Various Artists 1986 compilation album Live! For Life on the song "I Been Down So Long" with Sting
Malcolm McLaren's 1989 album Waltz Darling, on the tracks "House of the Blue Danube" and "Call a Wave"
Buddy Guy's 1991 album Damn Right, I've Got the Blues on the tracks "Mustang Sally" and "Early in the Morning"
Kate Bush's 1993 album The Red Shoes
Jimi Hendrix's song "Manic Depression" from the 1993 album Stone Free: A Tribute to Jimi Hendrix with Seal
Duff Mckagan's 1993 solo album Believe in Me on the tracks "(Fucked Up) Beyond Belief" and "Swamp Song"
Seal's 1994 album Seal
John McLaughin's 1995 album The Promise on the song "Django"
Instrumental version of "A Day in the Life" on the 1998 album In My Life
ZZ Top's 1999 release XXX on the track "Hey Mr. Millionaire".
 ZZ Top's 2016 live album Live: Greatest Hits from Around the World on the songs "Rough Boy" and "Sixteen Tons"
Joe Cocker's Heart & Soul album on the track "I (Who Have Nothing)"
Brian May's song "The Guv'nor" from the album Another World
Pretenders song "Legalise Me" from the 1999 album Viva El Amor
Chrissie Hynde's song "Mystery Train" from the 2001 album Good Rockin' Tonight: The Legacy of Sun Records
Roger Taylor's song "Say It's Not True" from the album Fun on Earth
Vanilla Fudge's album Mystery (credited as J. Toad)
Roger Waters' album Amused to Death
Cozy Powell's album Tilt on the tracks "Cat Moves" and "Hot Rock"
Jon Bon Jovi's solo album Blaze of Glory
Paul Rodgers' songs "Good Morning Little School Girl" & "I Just Want To Make Love To You"
Morrissey's album Years of Refusal on the song "Black Cloud"
Imelda May's album Life Love Flesh Blood on the song "Black Tears"
The Yardbirds' 2003 album Birdland on the song "My Blind Life"
Ruth Lorenzo's 2018 album Loveaholic on the song "Another Day"
 Rise (Hollywood Vampires album)2019 on the song “Welcome to Bushwackers”
Dion´s 2020 album Blues with Friends on the song "Can't Start Over Again"
Ozzy Osbourne's 2022 album Patient Number 9 on the songs "Patient Number 9" and "A Thousand Shades"

Notes

References

External links
 

Rock music discographies
Discographies of British artists